Bava Nachadu is a 2001 Indian Telugu-language romantic film directed by K. S. Ravikumar. It stars Nagarjuna Akkineni, Simran and Reema Sen, with music scored by M. M. Keeravani. It is produced by M. Arjuna Raju under the Roja Movies banner. The film was dubbed in Tamil as Hello Mama.

Plot
Ajay (Nagarjuna Akkineni) is an adman (director and actor) who has a definite idea about how his future wife should be. He marries a village belle Meenakshi (Simran), handpicked by his mother from her native town Kovvuru. Meenakshi soon becomes pregnant. Sometime later, Meenakshi meets with a hairline fracture. Her entire family lands up at Ajay's house to take care of Meenakshi.

She has a beautiful and greedy sister called Lahari (Reema Sen). During that period Suma (Suman Ranganathan), the regular model of Ajay meets with a fracture and Lahari replaces her as the model opposite Ajay. Lahari is lured by the modeling profession and then falls in love with Ajay. But Ajay does not have any feelings for her. Meenakshi gets well and her family returns to their village.

Lahari tells Meenakshi about her desire to marry Ajay. Meenakshi gets mad and returns home to her husband. Meanwhile, Lahari attempts suicide. Meenakshi, being very close to Lahari, promises Lahari that she will get her married to Ajay. The rest of the film is about how Ajay manages to save his marriage without hurting Lahari.

Cast

 Nagarjuna Akkineni as Ajay
 Simran as Meenakshi
 Reema Sen as Lahari
 Suman Ranganathan as Suma
 Tanikella Bharani
 Mallikarjuna Rao
 M. S. Narayana
 Sudha	
 Raja Ravindra
 Janardhan Maharshi
 Ananth Babu
 Manorama
 Rajitha
 K. S. Ravikumar (cameo)

Soundtrack

The music was composed by M. M. Keeravani. Music released on Supreme Audio company.

References

External links
 

2001 films
Films directed by K. S. Ravikumar
Indian romantic comedy films
Films scored by M. M. Keeravani
2000s Telugu-language films